The Vermont House of Representatives is the lower house of the Vermont General Assembly, the state legislature of the U.S. state of Vermont. The House comprises 150 members, with each member representing around 4,100 citizens. Representatives are elected to a two-year term without term limits.

Vermont had a unicameral legislature until 1836. It added a senate by constitutional amendment. The House meets in Representatives Hall at the Vermont State House in Montpelier. It is the only U.S. state legislature whose debating chamber seating layout comes closer to that of the Westminster-style parliament found elsewhere.

Leadership

The Speaker of the House presides over the House of Representatives. The Speaker is elected by the full House by Australian Ballot. If there is only one candidate, the election is usually held by voice vote. In addition to presiding over the body, the Speaker controls committee assignments and the flow of legislation.  Other House leaders, such as the majority and minority leaders and whips, are elected by their respective party caucuses relative to their party's strength in the chamber. There are three party caucuses in the Vermont House; the Democratic Caucus which is currently in the majority, and the Republican and Progressive Caucuses, each currently being in the minority. Independent members of the House may choose to caucus with a party or none at all.

On January 6, 2021, Jill Krowinski (D-Burlington) was sworn in as the Speaker of the House. The Clerk of the House is BetsyAnn Wrask.

Current leadership

Composition

Members 

↑: Member was originally appointed

Past notable members

Nearly all of the Governors of the state and most of its U.S. representatives and U.S. senators were first members of this house. Other prominent members include:
Consuelo N. Bailey, first woman elected lieutenant governor in the United States
Edna Beard (1877–1928), first woman to be elected to the Vermont House, and the first elected to the Vermont Senate
Francis William Billado, adjutant general of the Vermont National Guard
Ray W. Collins, pitcher, Boston Red Sox (1909–1915)
John Calvin Coolidge Sr., father of President Calvin Coolidge
Donald E. Edwards, adjutant general of the Vermont National Guard
Roger Enos, commander of the Vermont Militia during the American Revolution
William H. Gilmore, adjutant general of the Vermont National Guard
Lyman Enos Knapp, Governor of the District of Alaska (1889–1893)
Bruce M. Lawlor, major general in the Army National Guard and one of the creators of the Department of Homeland Security
Trenor W. Park, businessman and philanthropist
Alden Partridge, founder of Norwich University
Lewis Samuel Partridge, adjutant general of the Vermont National Guard
Edward H. Ripley, Union Army officer in the American Civil War, businessman and horse breeder
James Watson Webb II, businessman, philanthropist, and champion polo player
William Seward Webb, businessman and philanthropist

Operations
The house typically meets Tuesday through Friday during the session.

See also
Vermont State House
Vermont General Assembly
Speaker of the Vermont House of Representatives
Vermont Senate
Members of the Vermont House of Representatives, 2005–2006 session
Members of the Vermont House of Representatives, 2007–2008 session
Vermont Representative Districts, 2002–2012

References

External links
Vermont General Assembly
Speaker of the House

Politics of Vermont
State lower houses in the United States
Vermont articles needing attention